Leandro Alvés da Cunha (born November 30, 1980 in Rio de Janeiro) is a forward for
Boavista Sport Club.

References

External links
 Leandro Alves at playmakerstats.com (English version of ogol.com.br)
 Namibia: Brazilians to Light Up League

1980 births
Living people
Footballers from Rio de Janeiro (city)
Brazilian footballers
Brazilian expatriate footballers
Expatriate footballers in Romania
Liga I players
Expatriate footballers in Namibia
U.D. Leiria players
FC U Craiova 1948 players
Expatriate footballers in Portugal
Association football forwards
Botafogo de Futebol e Regatas players
Expatriate footballers in Italy
Orlando Pirates S.C. players
Expatriate footballers in Ivory Coast
A.S.D. Martina Calcio 1947 players
F.C. AK players